Daniel Douglas Johnson (October 1, 1944 – March 6, 1993) was a Canadian professional ice hockey player who spent three seasons in the National Hockey League (NHL) and another three seasons in the World Hockey Association (WHA) during the 1970s. He was a member of the Vancouver Canucks' inaugural NHL team in 1970.

Playing career
Johnson was signed by the Toronto Maple Leafs following his junior career and spent five seasons with their Central Hockey League (CHL) affiliate, the Tulsa Oilers. He was twice a CHL All-Star and was league MVP in 1970, but only managed to earn a single game with the Leafs in the 1969–70 season.

He was claimed by the Vancouver Canucks in the 1970 NHL Expansion Draft and finally received the opportunity to stick in the NHL. In the Canucks' first season, he appeared in 66 games and recorded 15 goals (seventh on the team) along with 11 assists for 26 points. Midway through the following season, however, he was waived by the Canucks and claimed by the Detroit Red Wings. He struggled to find his offensive touch and finished the 1971–72 season with just 3 goals and 11 points in 54 games between Detroit and Vancouver.

In 1972, Johnson jumped to the fledgling WHA, signing with a Winnipeg Jets team featuring superstar Bobby Hull. He had the most successful stretch of his career in Winnipeg, emerging as a valuable leader and two-way player. In 1972–73, he recorded 19 goals and 42 points en route to helping the Jets to the inaugural Avco Cup Finals. Over the next two years, he added another 34 goals and was named Jets' captain for the 1974–75 before retiring the following year.

Johnson finished his career with 18 goals and 19 assists for 37 points in 121 NHL games, along with 62 penalty minutes. He added 53 goals and 58 assists for 111 points in 232 games in the WHA.

Career statistics

Awards and achievements
MJHL Second All-Star Team (1964)
CPHL Championship (1968)
CHL Second All-Star Team (1969 & 1970)
Most Valuable Player (CHL) (1970)
"Honoured Member" of the Manitoba Hockey Hall of Fame

External links

1944 births
1993 deaths
Brandon Wheat Kings players
Canadian ice hockey centres
Detroit Red Wings players
Ice hockey people from Manitoba
Flin Flon Bombers players
Fort Frances Royals players
People from Parkland Region, Manitoba
Rochester Americans players
Toronto Maple Leafs players
Vancouver Canucks players
Winnipeg Jets (WHA) players